Nariman Narimanov Stadium is a multi-purpose stadium in Neftchala, Azerbaijan.  It is currently used mostly for football matches and is the home stadium of FK Neftchala. The stadium holds 2,000 seats. The stadium is named after the Azerbaijani Communist statesman Nariman Narimanov.

See also
List of football stadiums in Azerbaijan

Sport in Azerbaijan
Football venues in Azerbaijan
Multi-purpose stadiums in Azerbaijan